Horace Monroe "Bud" Sherrod, Jr. (December 2, 1927 – August 31, 1980) was a professional American football end in the National Football League for the New York Giants in 1952. He played college football at the University of Tennessee.

Sherrod also served as an assistant football coach for the Texas Tech Red Raiders from 1954–1957 under DeWitt Weaver.

References

1927 births
1980 deaths
Players of American football from Knoxville, Tennessee
American football ends
American football defensive ends
Tennessee Volunteers football players
New York Giants players
Texas Tech Red Raiders football coaches